Serhiy Kravchuk (born 3 June 1964) is a Soviet fencer. He won a bronze medal in the team épée event at the 1992 Summer Olympics.

References

External links
 

1964 births
Living people
Sportspeople from Kyiv
Ukrainian male épée fencers
Soviet male épée fencers
Olympic fencers of the Unified Team
Fencers at the 1992 Summer Olympics
Olympic bronze medalists for the Unified Team
Olympic medalists in fencing
Medalists at the 1992 Summer Olympics